Richard Demeyer (20 October 1890 – 20 June 1964) was a Belgian sculptor. His work was part of the sculpture event in the art competition at the 1932 Summer Olympics.

References

1890 births
1964 deaths
20th-century Belgian sculptors
Olympic competitors in art competitions
Artists from Ghent